Famous Players may refer to

Famous Players theatres, a chain of Canadian motion picture theatres
Famous Players Film Company, an early American motion picture company founded by Adolph Zukor 
Famous Players-Lasky Corporation, a partnership with Adolph Zukor's company and Jesse L. Lasky that became Paramount Pictures